Leonid Ivanovich Rogozov (14 March 1934 – 21 September 2000) was a Soviet general practitioner who took part in the sixth Soviet Antarctic Expedition, 1960–1961. In April 1961 he had developed appendicitis while at Novolazarevskaya Station, and being the only medical professional there at the time, had to perform his own appendectomy.

Early years 
Leonid Rogozov was born in Dauriya, Borzinsky District, Chita Oblast, a remote village in eastern Siberia, a little over 10 miles from the Soviet border with Mongolia and China, near Manzhouli. His father was killed in  World War II in 1943. In 1953, Rogozov completed his studies at a secondary school in Minusinsk, Krasnoyarsk Krai, and was admitted to the Saint Petersburg State Pediatric Medical Academy Leningrad Pediatric Medical Institute now Saint Petersburg. After graduating in 1959 as a general practitioner, he started clinical training to specialise in surgery. In September 1960, at the age of 26, he interrupted his training and joined the sixth Soviet Antarctic Expedition as a medical doctor.

Antarctic service
From September 1960 until October 1962, Rogozov worked in Antarctica, in his role as the sole doctor for a team of thirteen researchers at the Novolazarevskaya Station, established in January 1961.

On the morning of 29 April 1961, Rogozov experienced general weakness, nausea, and moderate fever, and later pain in the lower right portion of his abdomen. None of the possible conservative treatments helped. By 30 April signs of localised peritonitis became apparent, and his condition worsened considerably by the evening. Mirny, the nearest Soviet research station, was more than 1,000 miles from Novolazarevskaya. Antarctic research stations of other countries did not have an aircraft available. Severe blizzard conditions prevented aircraft landing in any case. Rogozov had no option but to perform an operation on himself.

The operation started at 02:00 local time on 1 May with the help of a driver and meteorologist, who provided instruments and held a mirror so Rogozov could observe areas not directly visible. Rogozov lay in a semi-reclining position, half-turned to his left side. A solution of 0.5% novocaine was used for local anesthesia of the abdominal wall. Rogozov made a 10–12 cm incision of the abdominal wall, but while opening the peritoneum he accidentally cut the cecum and had to suture it. Then he exposed the appendix. According to his report, the appendix was found to have a dark stain at its base, and Rogozov estimated it would have burst within a day. The appendix was resected and antibiotics were applied directly into the peritoneal cavity. General weakness and nausea developed about 30–40 minutes after the start of the operation so that short pauses for rest were repeatedly needed after that. By about 04:00 the operation was complete.

After the operation gradual improvement occurred in the signs of peritonitis and in the general condition of Rogozov. Body temperature returned to normal after five days, and the stitches were removed seven days after the operation. He resumed his regular duties in about two weeks.

The self-surgery, which was photographed by his colleagues, captured the imagination of the Soviet public at the time. In 1961 he was awarded the Order of the Red Banner of Labour. The incident resulted in a change of policy, and thereafter, extensive health checks were mandatory for personnel to be deployed on such expeditions.

Later years
In October 1962, Rogozov returned to Leningrad and started working on an MD at his alma mater. In September 1966 he published a dissertation entitled Resection of the esophagus for treating esophageal cancer. He later worked as a doctor in various hospitals in Leningrad. From 1986 to 2000 he served as the head of the surgery department of Saint Petersburg Research Institute for Tubercular Pulmonology.

Rogozov died in 2000, aged 66, in Saint Petersburg, Russia, from lung cancer.

See also 
 Evan O'Neill Kane

References

External links
 , with photos from the operation

https://www.thisamericanlife.org/613/ok-ill-do-it This American Life podcast episode

1934 births
2000 deaths
People from Borzinsky District
Communist Party of the Soviet Union members
Soviet surgeons
Explorers of Antarctica
Health in Antarctica
1961 in Antarctica
Soviet Union and the Antarctic
Deaths from lung cancer